Afala Island is the rocky island off the north coast of Nelson Island in the South Shetland Islands, Antarctica extending 360 m in west-southwest to east-northeast direction and 310 m in south–north direction.

The island is "named after the ocean fishing trawler Afala of the Bulgarian company Ocean Fisheries – Burgas that operated in Antarctic waters off South Georgia during its fishing trip under Captain Kosyo Kostov in the 1985/86 season. The Bulgarian fishermen, along with those of the Soviet Union, Poland and East Germany are the pioneers of modern Antarctic fishing industry."

Location
British mapping in 1968.

Maps
 South Shetland Islands. Scale 1:200000 topographic map No. 3373. DOS 610 - W 62 58. Tolworth, UK, 1968.
 Antarctic Digital Database (ADD). Scale 1:250000 topographic map of Antarctica. Scientific Committee on Antarctic Research (SCAR). Since 1993, regularly upgraded and updated.

Notes

References
 Afala Island. SCAR Composite Gazetteer of Antarctica.
 Bulgarian Antarctic Gazetteer. Antarctic Place-names Commission. (details in Bulgarian, basic data in English)

External links
 Afala Island. Copernix satellite image

Islands of the South Shetland Islands
Ocean Fisheries – Burgas Co
Bulgaria and the Antarctic